Charles Wood may refer to:

Arts and entertainment
Charles Erskine Scott Wood (1852–1944), American author, activist, and attorney
Charles Wood (composer) (1866–1926), Irish composer and teacher
Charles Wood (actor) (1916–1978), American singer and actor in Broadway musicals
Charles Wood (playwright) (1932–2020), British playwright and screenwriter
Charlie Wood (musician), American singer, songwriter and keyboardist
Charlie Wood, English bassist for Pale Waves
Charlie Wood, cofounder of the Northern Cree Singers

Politics
Charles Wood, 1st Viscount Halifax (1800–1885), English politician
Charles Wood, 2nd Viscount Halifax (1839–1934), English politician
Charles Wood, 2nd Earl of Halifax (1912–1980), British politician and peer

Sports
Charles Wood (jockey) (1855–1945), British jockey
Charles Winter Wood (1869–1953), football coach for Tuskegee University Golden Tigers
Charlie Wood (footballer) (born 2002), English footballer

Other
Charles Wood (ironmaster) (1702–1774), British chemist
Charles H. Wood (1837–1917), British chemist
Charles Thorold Wood (1777–1852), English ornithologist
Charles Wood (businessman) (1914–2004), American businessman
Charles Chatworthy Wood Taylor (1792–1856), English artist and engineer, designer of the coat of arms of Chile
Charles Carroll Wood (1876–1899), Canadian military officer

See also
Charles Woods (disambiguation)